The Christie M1931, known as the Combat Car, T1 in US Cavalry use and Medium Tank, Convertible, T3 in Infantry branch, was a wheel-to-track tank designed by J. Walter Christie for the United States Army using Christie's ideas of an aero-engine and the novel Christie suspension to give high mobility.

The M1931 was Christie's first tank to be accepted for production by the US Army and was used briefly by experimental tank units. Christie's design had more influence in Europe, with the USSR and the UK developing Christie's ideas in the form of Bystrokhodny (fast) tanks and cruiser tanks respectively.

Development
The Christie M1931 originated as the M1928, which used Christie's suspension, and had the ability to run on its tracks or the wheels. This prompted sufficient interest to properly consider Christie's ideas.

In 1930, after protracted negotiations, a contract was signed with Christie's US Wheel Track Layer Corporation to build an improved version of the M1928 at a cost of $55,000.

The prototype M1931, without armament, was delivered in March 1931. An order for seven more was placed in June; these were delivered by 1932. Officially called the "Convertible Medium Tank T3", three went to Company F, 67th Infantry (Medium Tanks) at Fort Benning. The remaining four were passed to the 1st Cavalry Regiment (Mechanized) at Fort Knox. With the gun replaced by a heavy machine gun they were renamed "Combat Car T1". The prototype was returned to Christie.

See also
 Tanks of the interwar period
 Tanks of the United States

Notes

References

External links
 "Christie M1931/ Medium Tank T3/ Combat Car T1" at History of War
 "Christie M1931" at Tank Archives

Interwar tanks of the United States